Lloyd Austin may refer to:

 Lloyd Austin (born 1953), former American military general and 28th United States Secretary of Defense  
 Lloyd James Austin (1915–1994), Australian linguist and literary scholar
 Colin François Lloyd Austin (1941–2010), British scholar